Ami, it's time to go! Plädoyer für die Selbstbehauptung Europas is a 2022 book by the German politician Oskar Lafontaine. The book is critical of NATO and the United States. The title is adapted from the 1970s slogan "" Ami is German slang for Americans.

Summary
Over 64 pages, Oskar Lafontaine, who briefly served as Minister of Finance in the First Schröder cabinet and later co-founded The Left, gives his analysis of the relationship between Germany and the United States. He is highly critical of the American military presence in Germany and the policies on NATO, which he says is impossible to regard as a defence organisation and only can be described as a tool for American geopolitical interests. Lafontaine says Germany's military aid to Ukraine during the 2022 Russian invasion of Ukraine shows how Germany is not an independent country, but a vassal state to the United States. He argues that Europe needs to break with its submission to American interests and pave its own way.

Reception
The book was published by Westend Verlag in Frankfurt on 21 November 2022. It had a first print run of 10,000 copies and entered the German bestseller chart for non-fiction on position ten.

See also
 Anti-American sentiment in Germany
 List of United States Army installations in Germany

References

External links
 Westend Verlag

2022 non-fiction books
German non-fiction books
Opposition to NATO
Germany and NATO
Anti-American sentiment in Germany
Books about the United States written by foreigners
Books about foreign relations of the United States
Reactions to the 2022 Russian invasion of Ukraine